Armin Wurm (born June 11, 1989) is a German professional ice hockey defenceman. He is currently playing for Grizzlys Wolfsburg in the Deutsche Eishockey Liga (DEL).

References

External links

1989 births
Living people
ETC Crimmitschau players
German ice hockey defencemen
Grizzlys Wolfsburg players
Sportspeople from Füssen